Stuart Cary Welch Jr. (2 April 1928 – 13 August 2008) was an American scholar and curator of Indian and Islamic art.

Life and career

Welch was born to a prominent family in Buffalo, New York. His maternal grandfather, Norman Edward Mack, was publisher of The Buffalo Times. He began collecting drawings by Indian artists as a boy. He earned a bachelor's degree in fine arts from Harvard University in 1950, then did graduate work there in classical art. Because they offered no Indian or Islamic art courses at the time, he became an autodidact.

His first paid position at Harvard was in 1956, as honorary assistant keeper of Islamic Art at the Fogg Museum. He later developed one of the first curricula for Islamic and Indian art. He was curator of Islamic and Later Indian art at the Harvard Art Museum, and from 1979 to 1987, he was also special consultant for the department of Islamic art at the Metropolitan Museum of Art. Welch taught at Harvard until his retirement in 1995, and he donated much of his collection to the school. A resident of New Hampshire, Welch died of a heart attack while traveling in Hokkaido, Japan.

The remainder of his personal collection was auctioned by Sotheby's in 2011. On 6 April 2011, a single page from the Shahnameh of Shah Tahmasp (The Houghton Shahnameh) of which Welch was the leading scholar, was sold for 7.4 million pounds ($12 million).

Selected publications
Royal Persian Manuscripts, Thames & Hudson, 1976, 
Room for Wonder: Indian Painting During the British Period, 1760-1880. American Federation of Arts, 1978
Imperial Mughal Painting. Braziller, 1978
The Houghton Shahnameh (with Martin Bernard Dickson). Harvard University, 1981

References

Further reading

External links
The Stuart Cary Welch Collection, Part One: Arts of the Islamic World
The Stuart Cary Welch Collection, Part Two: Arts of India
The Stuart Cary Welch Islamic and South Asian Photograph Collection at Harvard Library

1928 births
2008 deaths
Harvard College alumni
American art historians
American art curators
Historians of Islamic art
20th-century American historians
American male non-fiction writers
20th-century American male writers